Desmonus is a genus of flat-backed millipedes in the family Sphaeriodesmidae. There are about 10 described species in Desmonus.

Species
These 10 species belong to the genus Desmonus:
 Desmonus acclivus (Loomis, 1966)
 Desmonus atophus (Chamberlin & Mulaik, 1941)
 Desmonus austrus Causey, 1958
 Desmonus conjunctus Loomis, 1959
 Desmonus crassus Loomis, 1959
 Desmonus curtus (Loomis, 1943)
 Desmonus distinctus Loomis, 1959
 Desmonus earlei Cook, 1898
 Desmonus inordinatus Causey, 1958
 Desmonus pudicus (Bollman, 1888)

References

Further reading

 
 

Polydesmida
Articles created by Qbugbot